Live Animals is a 2008 American horror film starring John Still, Christian Walker, and Jeanette Comans and co-written, produced and directed by Jeremy Benson.

Plot
A group of college students fight to regain their freedom after being kidnapped by a white slave trader.

References

External links

2008 films
American horror films
2000s English-language films
2000s American films